London- and Prague-based Equus Press (Écriture en Quête d’Usage), founded in 2011, focuses on publishing experimental Anglophone writers  and is concerned primarily with English language writing from outside of normal English-speaking areas.

Since it was established, Equus Press has published the works of such as authors Louis Armand, Thor Garcia, Ken Nash, and Damien Ober.

In April 2013, Equus Press published Louis XXX (Georges Bataille) in a translation by Stuart Kendall. 2014 saw the release of Cairo (Louis Armand), a novel shortlisted for the 2014 Guardian Not-the-Booker Prize, and the novel Doctor Benjamin Franklin’s Dream America (Damien Ober) which deals with an alternative American colonial history.

2015 will see Equus Press publishing work by, among others, Holly Tavel, Richard Makin, and another book of translation (by Veronika Stankovianska and David Vichnar) from French, H by Philippe Sollers.

References

External links 
Equus Press
Interview with Founder of Equus Press
Equus Press on Facebook

Book publishing companies of the Czech Republic
Mass media in Prague